Antônio da Silveira (9 March 1906 – 4 June 1990) was a Brazilian sports shooter. He competed in the 25 m rapid fire pistol event at the 1932 Summer Olympics.

References

External links
 

1906 births
1990 deaths
Brazilian male sport shooters
Olympic shooters of Brazil
Shooters at the 1932 Summer Olympics
People from Piracicaba
Sportspeople from São Paulo (state)
20th-century Brazilian people